2,5-Dimethoxy-3,4-methylenedioxyamphetamine (DMMDA) is a psychedelic drug of the phenethylamine and amphetamine chemical classes. It was first synthesized by Alexander Shulgin and was described in his book PiHKAL. Shulgin listed the dosage as 30–75 mg and the duration as 6–8 hours. He reported DMMDA as producing LSD-like images, mydriasis, ataxia, and time dilation.

Pharmacology  
The mechanism behind DMMDA's hallucinogenic effects has not been specifically established, however Shulgin describes that a 75 milligram dose of DMMDA is equivalent to a 75–100 microgram dose of LSD. LSD is a known 5-HT2A partial agonist. DMMDA also has an affinity for the 5-HT2A receptor in the human brain. Because similar chemicals, such as MDA and MMDA, act as agonists on the 5-HT2A, it is likely that DMMDA also acts as an agonist of the 5-HT2A receptor. This may suggest that the hallucinogenic effects of DMMDA result from its agonism of the 5-HT2A  receptor in the human brain. DMMDA also has lower affinities for other serotonin receptors, such as the 5-HT2B, 5-HT2C and 5-HT1B receptor as well as serotonin, dopamine and norepinephrine transporters, which may contribute to DMMDA's psychoactive effects. DMMDA-2's and DMMDA-3’s affinities for the 5-HT2A receptor are almost the same as DMMDA’s. 4,5-dimethoxy-2,3-methylenedioxyamphetamine's affinity for the 5-HT2A is slighly lower than DMMDA's; the affinity for the receptor stands at around 70% that of DMMDA. The two remaining isomers of DMMDA are 4,6-dimethoxy-2,3-methylenedioxyamphetamine and 5,6-dimethoxy-2,3-methylenedioxyamphetamine, which both have an affinity for the 5-HT2A receptor of around 65-70% that of DMMDA.

Chemistry 
Shulgin explains in his book that DMMDA has 6 isomers similar to TMA. DMMDA-2 is the only other isomer that has been synthesized as of yet. DMMDA-3 could be made from exalatacin (1-allyl-2,6-dimethoxy-3,4-methylenedioxybenzene). Exalatacin can be found in the essential oil of both Crowea exalata and Crowea angustifolia var. angustifolia. In other words, exalatacin is an isomer of both apiole and dillapiole, which can be used to make DMMDA and DMMDA-2 respectively. Exalatacin is almost identical to apiole and dillapiole, but differs from them in its positioning of its methoxy groups, which are in the 2 and 6 positions. Additionally, yet another isomer of DMMDA could be made from pseudo-dillapiole or 4,5-dimethoxy-2,3-methylenedioxyallylbenzene.

Synthesis 
Shulgin describes the synthesis of DMMDA from apiole in his book PiHKAL. Apiole is subjected to an isomerization reaction to yield isoapiole by adding to solution of ethanolic potassium hydroxide and holding the solution at a steam bath. The isoapiole is then nitrated to 2-nitro-isoapiole or 1-(2,3-dimethoxy-3,4-methylenedioxyphenyl)-2-nitropropene by adding it to a stirred solution of acetone and pyridine at ice-bath temperatures and treating the solution with tetranitromethane. The pyridine acts as a catalyst in this reaction. The 2-nitro-isoapiole is finally reduced to freebase DMMDA by adding it to a well-stirred and refluxing suspension of diethylether and lithium aluminum hydride under an inert atmosphere (e.g. helium). Finally, the freebase DMMDA converted into its hydrochloride salt.

Shulgin's synthesis of DMMDA is reasonably unsafe, since it involves the use of tetranitromethane, which is toxic, carcinogenic and prone to detonating. DMMDA can be made from apiole via other safer methods. Among other methods, DMMDA can be synthesize from apiole via the intermediate chemical 2,5-dimethoxy-3,4-methylenedioxyphenylpropan-2-one or DMMDP2P in the same manner as MDA is made from safrole. DMMDP2P can be made from apiole via a Wacker oxidation with benzoquinone. DMMDP2P can be alternatively made by subjecting apiole to an isomerisation reaction to yield isoapiole followed by a Peracid oxidation and finally a hydrolytic dehydration. Then the DMMDP2P can then be subjected to a reductive amination with a source of nitrogen, such as ammonium chloride, and a reducing agent, such as sodium cyanoborohydride or an amalgam of mercury and aluminium, to yield freebase DMMDA.

References 

Substituted amphetamines
Benzodioxoles
Hydroxyquinol ethers
Mescalines
2,5-Dimethoxyphenethylamines
Entactogens and empathogens